Pitavia punctata is a species of tree endemic to Chile in the family Rutaceae. It is endemic to Chile; an example habitat being the Chilean matorral.  It is threatened by habitat loss. Distinctive common names: Pitao, Pitran. It is found from Maule to Malleco (35 to 38°S) .

Description 
The bark is brownish-grey and soft texture and with roughnesses when adult. The leaves are simple and covered with visible dots against the light, very aromatic (citrus odor), they are arranged in whorls of three or in some cases they are opposite, leathery texture. Oblong and lanceolate-oblong shaped, apex slightly apiculate, attenuate base, petiole about 3–4 mm. Slightly toothed edges and the midrib distinct underneath. The leaves are 6.5–13 cm wide and 2.5–4 cm long. The flowers are hermaphrodite or unisexual about 1 cm 1 diameter, tetramerous, clustered in three-flowered axillary racemes, pedicels about 3–5.9 mm. Calyx is made up by four opposite sepals. Androecium made up by 8 stamens arranged in two whorls, those externals are longer and (4–5.44 mm) and opposite to the sepals while the internal's whorls are shorter (3-3.5 mm) and opposite to the petals. The tetracarpelar gynoecium has a superior ovary, globose and with marginal placentation. Styles about 0.8–0.9 mm, little papillose stigmas, the fruit is made up of globose 1–4 drupes (mostly one)  about 1.8–2.5 wide and 1.2–2 cm long,  greenish-yellow with dark dots. The glossy dark brown seeds are aovate about 0.8–1.5 cm with toothed edge and oblong shaped, the leaves are petiolate, yellowish-green, about 3–6 cm long.

Line notes

References 
 C. Michael Hogan & World Wildlife Fund. 2013. Chilean matorral. ed. M.McGinley. Encyclopedia of Earth. National Council for Science and the Environment. Washington DC
2006 IUCN Red List of Threatened Species.   Downloaded on 23 August 2007.

punctata
Endemic flora of Chile
Chilean Matorral
Trees of Chile
Endangered flora of South America
Taxonomy articles created by Polbot